Chiayi is a railway station in Chiayi, Taiwan served by Taiwan Railways and Alishan Forest Railway.

History

The station was firstly constructed in 1896 and opened on 20 April 1902 with service on the West Coast line. The station was a single-story wooden structure with Japanese style with slant roof and rain-shield walls. The rail line connected to the station roughly divides Chiayi City into two regions. The region located in front of the station prospered as the city business district, while the region located behind the station was scarcely developed. Service to the Alishan Forest Railway began in 1912 from the station. The station was renovated in June 1933 to its current structure.

Architecture
The station is located 30 metres above sea level. The at-grade station has one island platform and one side platform.

It is a steel concrete structure with classical symmetry design, simple gables, geometric totems and streamlined modern design. The platform roofs of the railway station were constructed with the railway tracks.

Around the station
 Art Site of Chiayi Railway Warehouse
 Chia-Le-Fu Night Market
 Chiayi Art Museum
 Chiayi City Council
 Chiayi Cultural and Creative Industries Park
 Chiayi Jen Wu Temple
 Museum of Old Taiwan Tiles
 Renyitan Dam
 Taiwan Hinoki Museum
 Wenhua Road Night Market

See also
 List of railway stations in Taiwan

References

External links 

Chiayi Station (Chinese)
Chiayi Station (English)

1902 establishments in Taiwan
Alishan Forest Railway stations
West District
Railway stations opened in 1902
Railway stations served by Taiwan Railways Administration
Railway stations in Chiayi